Zhu Gaoxu (30 December 1380 – 6 October 1426), the Prince of Gaoyang (高陽王, created 1395), later the Prince of Han (漢王, created 1404), was the second son of the Yongle Emperor and Empress Renxiaowen. Zhu Gaoxu fought with his elder brother Zhu Gaochi (the future Hongxi Emperor) for the throne.

Early life
As the second son of his father, Zhu Di, the Prince of Yan, he was made a second-rank prince under the title "Prince of Gaoyang" (高陽王) in 1395.

Though he had established meritorious services during Jingnan Campaign for his father, the Yongle Emperor still made his eldest son, Zhu Gaochi the crown prince and granted Zhu Gaoxu the princedom and the title of "Prince of Han" in 1404. Even after the succession was cemented, Zhu Gaoxu attempted to oust his older brother many times. 

Gaoxu's princely fief was originally located in Yunnan, he was opposed to this decision and rely on the capital. Until 1416, after finishing the second Mongols campaign, the emperor find out Gaoxu's offence, Gaoxu was forced to move to his new fief, Le'an (樂安), Shandong (today's northeastern of Guangrao County).

Rebellion

In Shandong, Gaoxu lived as a farmer but secretly trained his army since he had always intended to rebel. Through the years, Gaoxu gained much more power and recruited many generals including General Wu Sien from the marine division.

At the time his nephew became the Xuande Emperor, Gaoxu started his rebellion. The new emperor himself led 20,000 troops in his attack against Gaoxu. General Wu Sien betrayed him and turned to attack Gaoxu. Soon afterward, Gaoxu lost the battle and then surrendered. He was reduced to a commoner, six hundred rebelling officials were executed, and 2,200 were banished.

Death
The emperor did not wish to execute his uncle at the start, but later events angered the emperor so much, that Zhu Gaoxu was executed through fire torture, and all of Zhu Gaoxu's sons were executed as well. It is very likely that Zhu Gaoxu's arrogance, which is well detailed in many historic texts, offended the emperor. A theory states that when the emperor went to visit his uncle, Zhu Gaoxu intentionally tripped the emperor.

Family
Consorts and Issue:
 Princess consort of Han, of the Wei clan (漢王妃 韋氏) (created 1404)
 1st son: Zhu Zhanhe, Hereditary Prince Zhuangyi (懿莊世子 朱瞻壑; 1398 – 26 September 1421), no issue
 2nd son: Zhu Zhanqi (朱瞻圻; d. 6 October 1426), originally the Hereditary Prince (世子) (created 1421), later demoted to commoner rank and forced into house arrest in Fengyang (demoted 1425), later executed (executed 1426), no issue.
 3rd son: Zhu Zhantan, Hereditary Prince (世子 朱瞻坦) (created 1424), executed along with his father (executed 1426), no issue.
 Lady Guo (郭氏), daughter of Guo Ying's (郭英) second son, Guo Ming (郭銘). Her eldest sister was Noble Consort Guo, a concubine of the Hongxi Emperor.
 Lady Deng (鄧氏), daughter of Deng Yuan (鄧源)
 Unknown
 4th son: Zhu Zhanci, Prince of Jiyang (濟陽王 朱瞻垐) (created 1424), executed along with his father (executed 1426), no issue.
 5th son: Zhu Zhanyu, Prince of Linzi (臨淄王 朱瞻域) (created 1424), executed along with his father (executed 1426), no issue.
 6th son: Zhu Zhanyi, Prince of Zichuan (淄川王 朱瞻墿) (created 1424), executed along with his father (executed 1426), no issue.
 7th son: Zhu Zhanxing, Prince of Changle (昌樂王 朱瞻垶) (created 1424), executed along with his father (executed 1426), no issue.
 8th son: Zhu Zhanping, Prince of Qidong (齊東王 朱瞻坪) (created 1424), executed along with his father (executed 1426), no issue.
 9th son: Zhu Zhandao, Prince of Rencheng (任城王 朱瞻壔) (created 1424), executed along with his father (executed 1426), no issue.
 10th son: Zhu Zhanchang, Prince of Haifeng (海豐王 朱瞻㙊) (created 1424), executed along with his father (executed 1426), no issue.
 11th son: Zhu Zhanbang, Prince of Xintai (新泰王 朱瞻垹) (created 1424), executed along with his father (executed 1426), no issue.

Ancestry

References

"Early Ming China" by Edward Dreyer (1982).

Ming dynasty imperial princes
1380 births
1426 deaths
15th-century executions by China
Executed royalty
Ming dynasty rebels
People executed by boiling
Rebellious princes
Yongle Emperor
Sons of emperors